The 1860 United States presidential election in Indiana took place on November 6, 1860, as part of the 1860 United States presidential election. Indiana voters chose 13 representatives, or electors, to the Electoral College, who voted for president and vice president.

Indiana was won by Representative Abraham Lincoln (R–Illinois), running with Senator Hannibal Hamlin, with 51.09% of the popular vote, against Senator Stephen A. Douglas (D–Illinois), running with 41st Governor of Georgia Herschel V. Johnson, with 42.44% of the popular vote.

Results

See also
 United States presidential elections in Indiana

References

Indiana
1860
1860 Indiana elections